Harland Amos McPhetres (February 8, 1892 – May 3, 1972) was an American politician who served as the 37th Mayor of Lynn, Massachusetts, USA.

References

Notes

1892 births
1972 deaths
Mayors of Lynn, Massachusetts
1924 United States presidential election
20th-century American politicians